Virginia Ali (born December 17, 1933) is an American business owner known for co-founding Ben's Chili Bowl in Washington, D.C.

Early life 
Ali was born on December 17, 1933, and is of African American and Native American descent. She was raised in rural Virginia and was educated in a segregated school system. She moved with her family to Washington, D.C., in the 1950s.

Career 
After moving to Washington, Ali worked as a teller at Industrial Bank, a historic Black owned business. It was there that she met husband Ben Ali when he visited the bank to deposit money from a local restaurant where he worked. 

Ali and Ben opened Ben's Chili Bowl on U Street in Washington, D.C., on August 22, 1958. Many famous entertainers frequented the family-run restaurant, in the heart of the Shaw neighborhood. The restaurant became a favorite late-night gathering place for the likes of Duke Ellington, Dinah Washington and Redd Foxx. Martin Luther King Jr., Jesse Jackson, and Stokely Carmichael often ate together at the Chili Bowl.

During the 1968 Washington, D.C., riots after the death of King, Ali kept the Chili Bowl open at the request of Stokely Carmichael.

Ali has served on the boards of several of organizations including For Love of Children.

Awards and honors
Ali was inducted in the DC Hall of Fame along with her husband in 2002. She and Ben received the Key to the City from mayor Adrian Fenty in honor of the restaurant’s 50th anniversary in 2008.

Personal life
Virginia and Ben Ali were married on October 10, 1958, and together they had three sons. Each of their children were given the middle name Ben in case they took over the restaurant. All three eventually became involved with running the restaurant after Ben's death.

References

External links
Ben's Chili Bowl official website

1933 births
Living people
African-American women in business
American women restaurateurs
American restaurateurs
20th-century African-American people
20th-century African-American women